Aharon Avraham Kabak (Smorgon, 1880 - Jerusalem 1944) was a Lithuanian born Hebrew language author. He was recipient of the Bialik Prize for Literature in 1943.

His "On the narrow path" Ba-Mishcol Ha-Tsar was a novelization of the life of Yeshu, Jesus of Nazareth.

References

Hebrew-language writers
Lithuanian writers
1880 births
1944 deaths
Emigrants from the Russian Empire to the Ottoman Empire